Ajay Tandon (born 4 September 1954) is an Indian politician from Madhya Pradesh who is serving as Member of 15th Madhya Pradesh Assembly from Damoh Assembly constituency on behalf of Indian National Congress.

Personal life 
He was born on 4 September 1954 in Damoh to Chandra Narayan Tandon. He is married to Anju Tandon and has 2 daughters.

References 

Living people
1954 births
Indian National Congress politicians from Madhya Pradesh
Madhya Pradesh MLAs 2018–2023
People from Damoh
Madhya Pradesh politicians
21st-century Indian politicians